Bensville is a suburb of the Central Coast region of New South Wales, Australia. It is part of the  local government area.

The main section of Bensville is centred on Kallaroo Road, and consists of a small park, video store, cafe, general store and hairdressers. A small combination of shops have recently been added in 2005. There is a small wharf located at the end of Kallaroo Road, which is a popular local fishing spot.

History 
Bensville is named after a pioneer of the area, Benjamin Davis. His father had been a school teacher at Kincumber and Davistown is named after his family. Benjamin started a shipbuilding business around 1850 and also owned  of land there. When a post office was opened, it was named Bensville, in honour of the pioneer.

References

Suburbs of the Central Coast (New South Wales)